The 2011–12 Rapid City Rush season is the fourth season in the Central Hockey League for the professional ice hockey franchise in Rapid City, South Dakota.

Regular season

Conference standings

Transactions
The Rush have been involved in the following transactions during the 2011–12 season.

Trades

Roster
Updated Dec 12, 2011.

|}

See also
 2011–12 CHL season

References

External links
 2011–12 Rapid City Rush season at Pointstreak

R
R